Park Joo-mi (born October 5, 1972) is a South Korean actress.

Career
Park made her entertainment debut as an Asiana Airlines model, then began acting in 1991, starring in television dramas such as Beautiful Seoul (1999) and Feels Good (2000). After appearing in Ladies of the Palace, Park married businessman Lee Jang-won in 2001 and temporarily retired from acting to focus on her family (she gave birth to her sons in 2002 and 2007). During this time, Park intermittently appeared in commercials and co-hosted the variety show Yeo Yoo Man Man from 2003 to 2005. After a nine-year absence, she made her screen comeback in the thriller Man of Vendetta (2010) and the family drama Believe in Love (2011). In 2012, Park had been playing Queen Seondeok in the period drama The King's Dream for 18 episodes (of a projected 70), when a car accident on the way to the set resulted in internal injuries, and she had to drop out of the series to undergo medical treatment. Upon her recovery, Park returned to television in 2014 with The Story of Kang-goo.

In February 2019, Park signed with new agency Huayi Brothers.

Filmography

Television series

Film

Variety show

Awards and nominations

References

External links

 
 

1972 births
Living people
South Korean television actresses
South Korean film actresses
Seoul Institute of the Arts alumni
Sungkyunkwan University alumni
People from Seoul